Grace Margaret Beverley, formerly known by her online moniker GraceFitUK, is a social media influencer and founder of the direct-to-consumer fitness brands TALA and Shreddy. Having amassed a considerable following on personal social media accounts as a student under the name GraceFitUK, Beverley's involvement in TALA and Shreddy began when she was an undergraduate at St Peter's College, Oxford.

Early life and education 
Grace Margaret Beverley was born in London, England, on 16 February 1997 to Victoria, a curator (daughter of multimillionaire property developer Sir Nigel Broackes), and Peter Beverley. She is the third of four daughters.

Beverley attended St Paul's Girls' School and as a teenager was Dean's Chorister (head chorister) at Salisbury Cathedral. She went on to gain a choral scholarship at St Peter's College, Oxford, where she studied music as an undergraduate, graduating in 2019.

Career

Social media influencer
Beverley's social media accounts- including on YouTube and Instagram- under the name of GraceFitUK, as a "lifestyle vlogger" with a focus on fitness and veganism, enabled her to sell workout and diet guides to her fanbase, as well as led to her working with fitness company Gymshark. With the support of Genflow, an influencer brand-building company, Beverley established two companies, TALA and Shreddy.

TALA and Shreddy 
TALA is a clothing brand that markets itself as providing sustainably made clothing. According to the company, most garments are made from recycled materials such as plastic bottles upcycled into yarn, or factory offcuts, retailing at prices similar to brands such as Nike and Adidas. It was launched in 2019 and turned over £6.2 million in its first year. Beverley is the founder and current CEO.

Shreddy is a fitness tech and equipment brand. Users pay a monthly fee to access exercise classes and meal plans on the app according to their preferences and goals, and can buy branded equipment required to complete the classes. Beverley is the founder and current CEO.

Some equipment now sold under the Shreddy umbrella brand was originally designed for one of Beverley's previous businesses, B_ND, which focussed on retailing resistance bands for home and gym use. The B_ND concept was assimilated into the Shreddy brand in 2020.

Publications 
Beverley's first book, Working Hard, Hardly Working: how to achieve more, stress less and feel fulfilled, was published in April 2021.

References 

1997 births
People educated at St Paul's Girls' School
Alumni of St Peter's College, Oxford
21st-century English businesswomen
21st-century English businesspeople
Living people
Businesspeople from London